Benoît de Sainte-Maure (died 1173) was a 12th-century French poet, most probably from Sainte-Maure-de-Touraine near Tours, France. The Plantagenets' administrative center was located in Chinon, west of Tours.

Le Roman de Troie

His 40,000 line poem Le Roman de Troie ("The Romance of Troy"), written between 1155 and 1160, was a medieval retelling on the epic theme of the Trojan War which inspired a body of literature in the genre called the roman antique, loosely assembled by the poet Jean Bodel as the Matter of Rome. The Trojan subject itself, for which de Sainte-Maure provided an impetus, is referred to as the Matter of Troy.

Chronique des ducs de Normandie

Another major work, by a Benoît, probably Benoît de Sainte-Maure, is a lengthy verse Chronique des ducs de Normandie.  Its manuscript at Tours, dating to 1180–1200, is probably the oldest surviving text in Old French transcribed on the Continent. The first published edition was by Francisque Michel, 3 volumes, 1868-1844, based on the British Library manuscript. The standard edition is by Carin Fahlin (Uppsala), 3 volumes, 1951–1967, and is based on the Tours manuscript with variants from the British one.

'Beneeit' is mentioned at the end of Wace's Roman de Rou, which is also on the subject of the Dukes of Normandy:

Notes

References 

 Benoît de Sainte-Maure, Le Roman de Troie, edited by Léopold Constans, 6 vols., Société des Anciens Textes Français, Paris: Firmin Didot, 1904–1912.
 
 Cristian Bratu, « Je, auteur de ce livre »: L’affirmation de soi chez les historiens, de l’Antiquité à la fin du Moyen Âge. Later Medieval Europe Series (vol. 20). Leiden: Brill, 2019.
 Cristian Bratu, “Translatio, autorité et affirmation de soi chez Gaimar, Wace et Benoît de Sainte-Maure.” The Medieval Chronicle 8 (2013): 135-164.
 C. Durand, Illustrations médiévales de la légende de Troie. Catalogue commenté des manuscrits fr. illustrés du Roman de Troie et de ses dérivés, Brepols Publishers, 2010,

External links 
  Benoît de Sainte-Maure on Archives de Littérature du Moyen Âge, Laurent Brun et al., last updated January 2019.
 Chronique des ducs de Normandie, Francisque Michel (editor), available online via Internet Archive (tome I, tome II, tome III).

1173 deaths
French poets
12th-century French writers
Trojan War literature
Epic poets
Romance (genre)
Year of birth unknown
12th-century French poets
French male poets